Beverley and Holderness is a county constituency in the East Riding of Yorkshire for the House of Commons of the Parliament of the United Kingdom. It elects one Member of Parliament (MP) at least once every five years by the first-past-the-post electoral system. The constituency has been represented by Graham Stuart of the Conservative Party since the 2005 general election.

History
The seat has been won by the Conservative candidate since its creation in 1997, on a majority ranging between 1.7% of the votes cast in the 2001 general election and 38.2% in the 2019 general election. The party of the runner-up candidate has been Labour six times and Liberal Democrat once, as of the 2019 general election.

Boundaries

1997–2010: The East Yorkshire Borough of Beverley wards of Cherry Holme, Leconfield, Leven, Minster North, Minster South, Molescroft, St Mary's East, St Mary's West, Tickton, Walkington, and Woodmansey, and the Borough of Holderness.

2010–present: The District of East Riding of Yorkshire wards of Beverley Rural, Mid Holderness, Minster and Woodmansey, North Holderness, St Mary's, South East Holderness, and South West Holderness.

Constituency profile
The constituency covers the southeastern portion of the East Riding of Yorkshire and borders East Yorkshire, Haltemprice and Howden, Kingston upon Hull North and Kingston upon Hull East seats. It also borders a stretch of the North Sea coast from Skipsea to Spurn Point, and the north bank of the Humber Estuary inland to Hedon.

From and including the 2010 general election the composition of the seat has changed; the civil parishes Brandesburton and Woodmansey were transferred to other seats (East Yorkshire and Haltemprice and Howden respectively). Middleton on the Wolds and Newbald were gained from the same respective seats.

Besides Beverley, the seat incorporates the market town of Hedon, which was itself a parliamentary borough until that seat was abolished at the Reform Act 1832.

Members of Parliament

Elections

Elections in the 2010s

Elections in the 2000s

Elections in the 1990s

See also
List of parliamentary constituencies in Humberside

References

Parliamentary constituencies in Yorkshire and the Humber
Constituencies of the Parliament of the United Kingdom established in 1997
Politics of the East Riding of Yorkshire
Holderness